Agordat Airport  is an airstrip serving Agordat, Eritrea.

See also
Transport in Eritrea

References                

 Great Circle Mapper - Agordat
Google Earth

Airports in Eritrea